Bernhard I, Prince of Anhalt-Bernburg (c. 1218–1287) was a German prince of the House of Ascania and ruler of the principality of Anhalt-Bernburg.

He was the second son of Henry I, Count of Anhalt (who was elevated to the rank of prince in 1218), by his wife Irmgard, daughter of Hermann I, Landgrave of Thuringia.

Life
After the death of Henry I in 1252, the surviving sons of the late prince divided his lands between them according to the laws of the House of Ascania. Bernhard received Bernburg.

Marriage and issue
In Hamburg on 3 February 1258, Bernhard married Princess Sophie (b. 1240 – d. aft. 1284), daughter of King Abel of Denmark. They had six children:
 John I, Prince of Anhalt-Bernburg (d. 5 June 1291)
 Albert (d. 14 September 1324), Bishop of Halberstadt (1304–1324)
 Bernhard II, Prince of Anhalt-Bernburg (b. ca. 1260 – d. aft. 26 December 1323)
 Henry (d. aft. 14 March 1324), Prior of the Dominicans in Halberstadt
 Rudolph (I) (d. 27 October 1286 / 11 July 1299?)
 Sophie (d. aft. 20 May 1322), married bef. 28 February 1282 to Count Dietrich II of Honstein.

Princes of Anhalt-Bernburg
1210s births
1287 deaths
Year of birth uncertain